The Press Information Bureau, commonly abbreviated as PIB, is a nodal agency of the Government of India under Ministry of Information and Broadcasting. Based in National Media Centre, New Delhi, Press Information Bureau disseminates information to print, electronic and web media on government plans, policies, programme initiatives and achievements.
It is available in 14 Indian official languages, which are Dogri, Punjabi, Bengali, Oriya, Gujarati, Marathi, Meitei (Manipuri), Tamil, Kannada, Telugu, Malayalam, Konkani and Urdu, in addition to Hindi and English, out of the 22 official languages of the Indian Republic.

The head of PIB is also the Official Spokesperson of the Government of India and holds the rank of Principal Director General (Special Secretary equivalent). The post is currently headed by Satyendra Prakash, IIS (Batch of 1988).

History
The Press Information Bureau was established in June 1919 as a small cell under Home Ministry under the British government. Its main task was to prepare a report on India to be placed before the British Parliament. It was then located in Shimla.

The first head of the publicity cell was Dr. L.F. Rushbrook Williams of Allahabad University who was designated as Officer on Special Duty.   Prof. Williams had earlier worked with Sir Stanley Reed on the Central Publicity Board.

In 1941, J. Natrajan became the first Indian to be head the Bureau as Principal Information Officer. The organisation's name was changed to the Press Information Bureau in 1946.

The Bureau has been reconstituted many times since independence of India in 1947.

Structure and Functioning of Press Information Bureau 
Administratively, the Press Information Bureau is one of the media units working under the Ministry of Information & Broadcasting, Government of India. It is the nodal agency for public communication and media relations for the entire Union Government of India (though some organizations have their own outfits to look after their specialized media and publicity functions, e.g. Ministry of External Affairs and the armed forces).

With headquarters in New Delhi, it now has a nation-wide network of 8 regional offices and 34 branch offices. Over 60 information officers are presently in position in the Bureau. The Bureau has Information Officers attached to different Ministries, constitutional bodies and autonomous organizations of the Government of India. They are responsible for information dissemination and unpaid publicity for those organizations.

The Bureau issues press releases, features, photographs, infographics and videos for giving information to electronic, print and web media on the following matters:
 Government Planning
 Government Policies
 Programme Initiatives
 Achievements of the Government

The Bureau has a Press Facilitation unit for press accreditation and facilitation during press conferences and events that are open for the media. At present, about 2500 editors, correspondents, camerapersons and technicians from print, radio, television and web media are accredited.

Its website contains archives of press releases issued by it since 1947. It has also launched the mobile version of its website and a mobile app.

In November 2019, the PIB set up a fact-checking unit to check government related news.

List of Heads/Government Spokespersons

See also
 Ministry of Information and Broadcasting
Prasar Bharati

Notes

References

External links
 
 History of PIB

Ministry of Information and Broadcasting (India)
Mass media in India
News agencies based in India
1919 establishments in India
Government agencies of India